Dion Lee (born 2 October 1985) is a fashion designer hailing from Sydney, Australia where his eponymous brand was established in 2009.

Lee debuted at Australian Fashion Week in 2009 after graduating from FDS (Fashion Design Studio) TAFE NSW the year prior. He was the first designer to stage a runway presentation at the Sydney Opera House in 2010.

After a national collaboration with Australian retail chain Cue Clothing Company in 2011, Lee announced a partnership in 2013 with the retailer who acquired an undisclosed shareholding of the business.

In September 2012, Lee showed at London Fashion Week for the second time and in February 2013, participated in the International Woolmark Prize as the Australian Finalist, also presented at London Fashion Week. He was profiled by Vogue US in 2013 in a feature article entitled 'From a Land Down Under'.

Lee debuted his Spring 2014 collection at New York Fashion Week in September 2013. After presenting regularly on the schedule, it was his Fall 2016 show, which saw American Vogue declare that ‘With his show this morning … Lee came of age as a New York designer’.

The label has been worn by Oscar Winners Jennifer Lawrence, Cate Blanchett and Charlize Theron. 

In October 2018, the Duchess of Sussex Meghan Markle, caused the Dion Lee website to crash when she was seen in Melbourne wearing one of their custom dresses.

Lee now divides his time between Sydney where his business and manufacturing headquarters are located and the brand's secondary base in New York.

Awards 

 2010 – Winner of the Woolmark Designer Award at Melbourne Fashion Festival
 2010 – Winner of the Qantas Spirit of Youth Award in Fashion Design
 2013 – Participation in the first International Woolmark Prize, representing Australia
 2013 – Winner of the Prix de Marie Claire Award – Best Australian Fashion Designer
 2013 – Winner of GQ Man of the Year – Best Designer
2017 – Confirmed as Designer of the new Sydney Opera House uniforms
2017 – Winner of the Australian Fashion Laureate

References

External links 
 Official website

1985 births
Living people
People from Sydney
Australian fashion designers
Australian company founders